Čabulītis (fl. 1935 – 21 August 2007) was a captive American Alligator residing at the Riga Zoo in Riga, Latvia. At time of his death he was thought to be one of the oldest captive alligators in Europe. Information at the Riga Zoo, dated 1 April 1935, suggests that he was 1 to 3 years old on arrival.

Physical characteristics and diet 
In 1958, 1970, and 1980 due to problems with heating of the crocodile house, Čabullītis would not consume food for periods of 5 to 7 months. He also liked herring, but refused to eat furry or live animals.

Biography
In Latvian, Čabulītis roughly translates to sweet and tender creature. At various times, the alligator was also known by the names Ulmanītis, Ali and Gena. Three other alligators about the same age lived at the zoo in the 1930s two females and a male. Little is known about Čabulītis' youth only that the alligators used to fight and Čabulītis bit one of the females in the tail. Apparently the alligators mated as well, but the eggs were not fertile. The other male was moved to the Kyiv Zoo in 1965. Both females were euthanized in the 1970s due to illnesses caused by injuries sustained in fights. Since that time Čabulītis was the only alligator in the zoo. 

In the 1980s an American crocodile, Balodītis (i.e., little dove), was housed in a room next to Čabulītis. (The ranges of the two species do overlap in the wild part of Florida.) Balodītis once managed to get into Čabulītis' room by climbing over the wall at night. As they didn't fight, Balodītis was allowed to share space until Čabulītis grew more aggressive and the reptiles were separated again.  

Čabulītis enjoyed being sprayed with warm water, having his back brushed, and he would roar when he heard the music of German pop duo Modern Talking. In the last ten years of his life, Čabulītis lost an increasing number of teeth and his movements became slower, causing visitors to wonder if the alligator was even alive. He spent a lot of time in the water as it became difficult for him to walk on dry land. Čabulītis died of lung disease and heart failure. A memorial was planned for Čabulītis, and his remains were stuffed and exhibited in the zoo along with his skeleton.

See also
 Muja, oldest living alligator in the world, living in Belgrade Zoo, Serbia
 Saturn, alligator taken to Moscow after WWII from the Berlin Zoo (died on 22 May 2020)

References

1930s animal births
2007 animal deaths
Individual alligators
Individual animals in Latvia